The Cranberries were an Irish rock band formed in Limerick in 1989, originally under the name The Cranberry Saw Us. Although widely associated with alternative rock, the band's sound incorporates post-punk and rock elements. Since their formation, the Cranberries have released eight studio albums, seven extended plays, 23 singles (including two re-releases), three live albums, seven compilation albums, eight video albums and 21 music videos.

The Cranberries rose to international fame with their debut album, Everybody Else Is Doing It, So Why Can't We?, which became a commercial success and was certified Platinum in Australia, 2× platinum in Britain, and 5× platinum in the US. Their next studio album, No Need to Argue, gave them the hit single "Zombie" and was their best-selling studio album. The band has achieved one number-one album on the UK Albums Chart (Everybody Else Is Doing It, So Why Can't We?) and two number-one singles on the Modern Rock Tracks chart ("Zombie" and "Salvation"). The album Roses was released on 27 February 2012. Their next record, Something Else, covering earlier songs together with the Irish Chamber Orchestra, was released on 28 April 2017. Their eighth and final studio album, In The End, was released on 26 April 2019.

The group covered "(They Long to Be) Close to You" on the 1994 tribute album If I Were a Carpenter.

Albums

Studio albums

Notes
A  Everybody Else Is Doing It, So Why Can't We? was remastered and re-released with exclusive bonus tracks in 2018.

Compilation albums

Live albums

Extended plays

Singles

Promotional singles

Videography

Music videos

References

Discography
Discographies of Irish artists
Rock music group discographies
Alternative rock discographies